Jonas Björkman and Byron Black were the defending champions, but Black did not compete this year. Björkman teamed up with Max Mirnyi and lost in quarterfinals to Sébastien Lareau and Daniel Nestor.

Mark Woodforde and Todd Woodbridge won the title by defeating Ellis Ferreira and Rick Leach 7–6(8–6), 6–4 in the final.

Seeds

Draw

Finals

Top half

Bottom half

References
 Main Draw (ATP)

Doubles